The 2015–16 UConn Huskies men's basketball team represented the University of Connecticut in the 2015–16 NCAA Division I men's basketball season. The Huskies were led by fourth-year head coach Kevin Ollie. The Huskies split their home games between the XL Center in Hartford, Connecticut, and the Harry A. Gampel Pavilion on the UConn campus in Storrs, Connecticut. The Huskies were members of the American Athletic Conference. They finished the season 25–11, 11–7 in American Athletic play to finish in sixth place. They defeated Cincinnati, Temple, and Memphis to be champions of the American Athletic tournament. They received an automatic bid to the NCAA tournament where they defeated Colorado in the Round of 64 before losing to Kansas in the Round of 32.

Previous season
The Huskies finished the season 21–10, 11-7 in AAC play to finish in fourth place. They advanced to the championship game of the American Athletic tournament where they defeated Memphis. They advanced to the second round of the NCAA tournament where they lost to Kansas.

Departures

Incoming transfers

Recruits

Roster

Schedule 

|-
!colspan=12 style=""| Exhibition

|- 
|-
!colspan=12 style=""| Regular season

|-
!colspan=12 style=""| AAC Tournament

|-
!colspan=12 style=""| NCAA tournament

Rankings

References 

UConn Huskies men's basketball seasons
Connecticut
Connecticut
2015 in sports in Connecticut
2016 in sports in Connecticut